Mohd Fahmi bin Aliman (Jawi: محمد فهمى عليمن; born 1972) is a Singaporean politician who has been serving as Mayor of South East District since 2020. A member of the governing People's Action Party (PAP), he has been the Member of Parliament (MP) representing the Geylang Serai division of Marine Parade GRC since 2020.

Early life and education
Fahmi was born in 1972 in Singapore to a father who was a gas checker and a mother who was a cleaner, and has two siblings. 

He attended Jubilee Primary School and Jurong Secondary School before graduating from Ngee Ann Polytechnic with a diploma. 

Fahmi subsequently went on to complete a Bachelor of Engineering with honours degree at the University of Liverpool. He also has a graduate diploma from the National University of Singapore in defence technological science.

Career

Military career
Fahmi served in the Singapore Army for 26 years and attained the rank Colonel. He was deployed for six months to Blangpidie, Sumatra, Indonesia for the Aceh Monitoring Mission in 2005, and six months in Kabul, Afghanistan in 2012 as part of Singapore's contribution to the International Security Assistance Force (ISAF). He was awarded Pingat Penghargaan (Tentera) in 2014 and Long Service Medal (Military) in 2017.

In 2019, Fahmi left the Singapore Armed Forces (SAF) and had a brief stint as the deputy chief executive of Majlis Ugama Islam Singapura (MUIS), before leaving to join the National Trades Union Congress (NTUC) as Director of the Administration and Research Unit in March 2020.

Political career
Fahmi made his political debut in the 2020 general election as part of a five-member PAP team contesting in Marine Parade GRC against the Workers' Party. His running mates were Tan Chuan-Jin, Seah Kian Peng, Tan See Leng, and Edwin Tong. On 11 July 2020, he was elected as the Member of Parliament (MP) representing the Geylang Serai ward of Marine Parade GRC after the PAP team garnered 57.76% of the valid votes.

Personal life 
Fahmi is married to Rohana Mohd Salleh, a teacher. They have three sons and a daughter.

Awards 
  Commendation Medal (Military) in 2014
  Long Service Medal (Military) in 2017

References

External links
 Mohd Fahmi Aliman on Parliament of Singapore

Living people
1972 births
National University of Singapore alumni
Ngee Ann Polytechnic alumni
Alumni of the University of Liverpool
People's Action Party politicians
Members of the Parliament of Singapore
Singaporean people of Malay descent
Singaporean Muslims